Vizgirda is a Lithuanian-language surname. It could be Polonized as Wizgierd or Wizgird. Notable people with the surname include:

 (born 1944), Lithuanian musician
Viktoras Vizgirda (1904-1993), Lithuanian artist

Lithuanian-language surnames